The London, Brighton and South Coast Railway H2 class was a class of 4-4-2 steam locomotives for express passenger work.  They were designed when D. E. Marsh was officially Locomotive Superintendent, and were built  at Brighton Works in 1911 and 1912.

Background
In 1911, D. E. Marsh was on leave of absence due to sickness, and his assistant Lawson Billinton was granted authority to construct a further six 4-4-2 'Atlantic' locomotives similar to the Marsh H1 class but incorporating the Schmidt superheater.

Construction and use
The new H2 class locomotives built by Brighton railway works and introduced between June 1911 and January 1912. They were an immediate success and shared with the H1 class the London to Brighton express trains including the heavily loaded Pullman services the Brighton Limited, and the Southern Belle, which the LB&SCR described as "the most luxurious train in the World". 

As with the non-superheated class they were gradually replaced on the London-Brighton express trains in 1925/6 by the "King Arthur" and "River" classes, but there was still plenty of work for them on other express services, including boat trains connecting with the Newhaven-Dieppe ferry service. At the same time they were all named after geographical features of the south coast.

Oliver Bulleid, familiar with the class from his time at the LNER, increased the boiler pressure of the H2 class from 170 psi to 200 psi starting in 1938 to match the H1.

Following the cessation of the cross-channel ferries after 1940, as a result of the Second World War, the class were left with little work to do and several were put into store or else moved to miscellaneous duties in southern England. The H2 class however returned to the boat trains after the end of the war and continued until the mid-1950s.

Withdrawal
One member of the class was withdrawn in 1949, but the remainder continued in regular use until 1956. No. 32424 "Beachy Head" was the last survivor, it was withdrawn in April 1958 and none were preserved.

Preservation
 
No examples of the H2 class were preserved, but on 29 October 2000 the Bluebell Railway announced its intention to reconstruct a replica  of SR/BR period Beachy Head. At the time of writing many surviving locomotive parts had been assembled including an ex-GNR 'Atlantic' boiler, and an ex-LB&SCR B4 class tender chassis. The boiler was tested around August 2018.

Models
Bachmann Branchline are producing an OO scale model of the class in three variations.

31-920 H2 Class Atlantic 4-4-2 No. 2421 South Foreland in Southern Railway olive green livery; 31-921A No. 32425 Trevose Head in BR black livery with early emblem. and 31-922 No. 422 in LB&SCR Lined Umber.

Locomotive Summary

Sources

Bibliography
 Bradley, D.L. (1974) Locomotives of the London Brighton and South Coast Railway Part 3, Railway Correspondence and Travel Society.

External links 
 -A Rail UK database, H2
View of no. 32424 Beachy Head on a LCGB "Southern Counties Limited" special on 24 February 1957

4-4-2 locomotives
H2
Railway locomotives introduced in 1911
Standard gauge steam locomotives of Great Britain
Scrapped locomotives
Passenger locomotives